Camden East Aerodrome  is a registered aerodrome located  southeast of Camden East, Ontario, Canada.

References

Registered aerodromes in Ontario